Arthur Seligman (June 14, 1871 – September 25, 1933) was an American businessman and politician. He served in several offices in New Mexico, including mayor of Santa Fe and governor.

Early life and education
Seligman was born in Santa Fe, New Mexico Territory, the son of Bernard and Frances Seligman. In 1887, he graduated from the Swarthmore College Preparatory School, and in 1889 he graduated from Union Business College.

Career 
After completing his education, Seligman became active in his family's business enterprises. He was also president of the Seligman Brothers mercantile firm (1903–1926), president of the La Fonda Building Corporation (1920–1926), president of the First National Bank (1924–1933); and auditor and board of directors member of the Northern New Mexico Loan Association.

A Democrat, Seligman was heavily involved in New Mexico's politics throughout his life. His party leadership positions included: chairman of the Santa Fe Democratic County Central Committee (1895–1911), chairman of the territorial Democratic Committee (1895–1911), chairman of the state Democratic committee (1912–1922); and delegate to the Democratic National Committee (1920–1933).

Seligman was also involved in government at the local, county, and state levels throughout his career. He served as member of the state Irrigation Commission (1904–1906), member of the New Mexico Board of Equalization (1906–1908), chairman of Santa Fe County Commission (1910–1920); mayor of Santa Fe (1910–1912), and president of the state Educational Survey Commission (1921–1923).

In 1930, Seligman was elected governor. He was reelected in 1932 and served from January 1, 1931 until his death.

Personal life
Seligman and Franc E. Harris (1867–1937) of Cleveland, Ohio were married on July 4, 1896. They were the parents of a son, Otis (1898–1943), and an adopted daughter, Ritchie Seligman (1888–1966).

Seligman died in Santa Fe, and was buried at Fairview Cemetery in Santa Fe.

References

External resources
Arthur Seligman at National Governors Association

Arthur Seligman at Political Graveyard

1871 births
1933 deaths
Democratic Party governors of New Mexico
Jewish American state governors of the United States
Jewish mayors of places in the United States
Mayors of Santa Fe, New Mexico
Jewish American people in New Mexico politics